Roberto Pasqual Pistarini (born 28 April 1948) is an Argentine equestrian. He competed in two events at the 1968 Summer Olympics.

References

External links
 

1948 births
Living people
Argentine male equestrians
Olympic equestrians of Argentina
Equestrians at the 1968 Summer Olympics
Sportspeople from Buenos Aires